John Byrom (born 16 March 1947) is an Australian former swimmer. He competed in the men's 200 metre backstroke at the 1964 Summer Olympics.

References

External links
 

1947 births
Living people
Australian male backstroke swimmers
Olympic swimmers of Australia
Swimmers at the 1964 Summer Olympics
Place of birth missing (living people)
20th-century Australian people